Pisary  is a village in the administrative district of Gmina Międzylesie, within Kłodzko County, Lower Silesian Voivodeship, in southwestern Poland. Prior to 1945 it was in Germany.

Notable residents
 Hans Iwand (1899 – 1960), German Lutheran theologian

References

Pisary